Luana Bertolucci Paixão (born 2 May 1993), commonly known as Luana, is a Brazilian footballer who plays as a midfielder for Brazilian Campeonato Brasileiro de Futebol Feminino Série A1 club Corinthians and the Brazil national team.

Club career
Luana was attached to São Bernardo, São Caetano and Corinthians as a young player. She signed for Associação Desportiva Centro Olímpico in early 2011.

She agreed a transfer to Norwegian Toppserien club Avaldsnes for their 2015 season, which culminated in them finishing as runners-up in both the League and Norwegian Women's Cup, qualifying them to the UEFA Women's Champions League for the first time. In 2017, Luana was Avaldsnes' Player of the Year as the club won the Norwegian Women's Cup. She signed a one-year extension to her contract in November 2017.

International career

Luana represented the Brazil women's national under-17 football team at the 2010 FIFA U-17 Women's World Cup in Trinidad and Tobago, where they reached the quarter-finals. After graduating to the under-20 team, she attended the FIFA U-20 Women's World Cup in 2012 in Japan.

In December 2012, she won her first cap for the senior Brazil women's national football team at the 2012 International Women's Football Tournament of City of São Paulo, appearing as a substitute for Érika in a 2–1 win over Denmark.

Luana was absent from Brazil's final 23-player squad for the 2019 FIFA Women's World Cup when it was announced on 16 May 2019. But she was added to the group the following day, when Adriana withdrew due to a knee ligament injury.

Career statistics

International
As of 31 July 2022

Scores and results list Brazil's goal tally first, score column indicates score after each Luana goal.

Honours

Club
Avaldsnes
 Norwegian Women's Cup: 2017

Paris Saint-Germain
 Division 1 Féminine: 2020–21
 Coupe de France féminine: 2021–22

References

External links
 
 

1993 births
Living people
People from São Bernardo do Campo
Women's association football midfielders
Brazilian women's footballers
Brazil women's international footballers
Toppserien players
WK League players
Division 1 Féminine players
Avaldsnes IL players
Paris Saint-Germain Féminine players
Sport Club Corinthians Paulista (women) players
2019 FIFA Women's World Cup players
Brazilian expatriate sportspeople in Norway
Brazilian expatriate sportspeople in South Korea
Brazilian expatriate sportspeople in France
Expatriate women's footballers in Norway
Expatriate women's footballers in South Korea
Expatriate women's footballers in France
Footballers from São Paulo (state)
21st-century Brazilian women